The Wig is a 2005 South Korean horror film.

The Wig may also refer to:

 The Wig (1925 film), a German silent comedy film
 Gerry "The Wig" Wiggins (1922–2008), American jazz pianist and organist
 A sub-plot of the 2012 film 3 A.M.
 The Wig, a 1960 novel by Charles Wright

See also
 Wig (disambiguation)